Gan HaShomron is a moshav in central Israel. Located north-east of Hadera, on the road to Afula, Highway 65, it falls under the jurisdiction of Menashe Regional Council.

History
The moshav was established in the spring of 1934 by Jewish immigrants from Germany who trained as farmers in Nahalal and Ein Shemer, and was named for its location on at the foot of the Shomron mountains. It was subsequently expanded three times, in 1946 by Jewish veterans of the British army, in 1954 by migration from the cities, and in 1957 by Jewish immigrants from Poland.

Economic branches
The main produce of Gan HaShomron is olive oil. Other produce includes fruit trees.

Notable residents
Dan Froyliche, Olympic sport sailor

References

German-Jewish culture in Israel
Moshavim
Agricultural Union
Menashe Regional Council
Populated places established in 1934
Populated places in Haifa District 
1934 establishments in Mandatory Palestine